"Still Holding On" is a song by Clint Black

Still Holding On may also refer to:

Film and TV
Still Holding On: The Legend of Cadillac Jack, the debut film of Cody Linley

Music
"Still Holding On", a song written by Robert Corbin from The Oak Ridge Boys album Deliver
"Still Holding On", a 2013 song by Conjure One (featuring Aruna)